Brad Warner (born March 5, 1964) is an American Sōtō Zen monk, author, blogger, documentarian and punk rock bass guitarist.

Biography
Brad Warner was born in Hamilton, Ohio, in 1964.  His family traveled for his father's job and Warner spent some time in Nairobi, Kenya, but grew up mainly near Akron, Ohio, and attended Kent State University. As a teenager Warner got into the music of the 1980s and hardcore punk, and a friend of his took him to a show by Zero Defex. He auditioned for and joined the band after finding out they needed a bass guitarist. He began practicing Zen Buddhism under his first teacher, Tim McCarthy. Warner later studied with Gyomay Kubose.

He has played with Dimentia 13. After the financial failure of his Dimentia 13 albums, Warner got a job in Japan with the JET Programme, and then later in 1994 with Tsuburaya Productions, the company behind Ultraman. Warner played the roles of various foreigners in their programs. While in Japan, he met and trained with Gudo Wafu Nishijima, a student of Rempo Niwa Zenji, who ordained him as a priest and named him as his dharma heir in 2000.

He agreed to write articles for SuicideGirls, an online soft porn site but stopped after a few years.

In 2007 he directed the documentary film Cleveland’s Screaming, which depicts the punk rock scene in Akron and Cleveland in the 1980s.

Also in 2007, Gudo Wafu Nishijima named Warner the leader of Dogen Sangha International which Nishijima had founded. Warner dissolved the organization in April 2012.

In 2008 Warner lost his job with the Japanese company he had been working for in the States and as of January 2009 he was self-employed.

In 2012, Warner moved to California and started Dogen Sangha Los Angeles.

In 2013, Pirooz Kalayeh directed a film about Warner entitled Brad Warner's Hardcore Zen The film premiered on October 5, 2013 in Amsterdam at the Buddhist Film Festival of Europe.

Bibliography

Fiction

Non-Fiction

Discography
Compilations

Dimentia 13

Guest appearances

0DFx
 (1982 demo reissue)
 (1982 demo and 1983 debut, 2 CD)
 (1983 debut reissue)
 (New recordings 2007/2008)

See also
Timeline of Zen Buddhism in the United States

References

Further reading

External links 

 
 Dogen Sangha Los Angeles
 Brad Warner's articles for Suicide Girls
 Dimentia 13 on the Midnight Records website
 Audio Interview Series on Buddhist Geeks
Brad Warner's articles for Tricycle: The Buddhist Review 
Daily Practice: How to Get on the Cushion Every Day a Tricycle Dharma Talk (2014)
 

1964 births
Living people
American monks
American punk rock musicians
American rock bass guitarists
American Zen Buddhist spiritual teachers
Kent State University alumni
Musicians from Akron, Ohio
Writers from Akron, Ohio
People from Hamilton, Ohio
Soto Zen Buddhists
Zen Buddhist monks
American Buddhists
Zen Buddhism writers
Religious leaders from Ohio
20th-century American bass guitarists
21st-century American bass guitarists
Guitarists from Ohio
American male bass guitarists
20th-century American male musicians
21st-century American male musicians
21st-century American Buddhists